Jack Pulman (11 July 1925 – 20 May 1979) was an award-winning British television screenwriter, most famous for the critically acclaimed 1976 BBC television series, I, Claudius, based on the novels I, Claudius and Claudius the God by Robert Graves.

Biography
Born and raised in London, Pulman was renowned as "adaptor-extraordinary," having written teleplays for such literary works as, The Portrait of a Lady, Jane Eyre, Crime and Punishment, David Copperfield, and War and Peace.

He died of a heart attack in London on 20 May 1979. His last screenplay, Private Schulz, went into production after his death. His widow, Barbara Young, collected a posthumous writers award from The Royal Television Society for his work on the show in 1982.

He also wrote the screenplays for the 1970 film The Executioner and the 1971 film adaptation of Robert Louis Stevenson's Kidnapped.

He was the father of actress and singer Liza Pulman.

References

External links

Writers from London
1925 births
1979 deaths
English television writers
British television writers
20th-century English dramatists and playwrights
English male dramatists and playwrights
20th-century English male writers
British male television writers
20th-century English screenwriters